Ireland and Scotland have played each other at rugby union in 140 matches, with Ireland winning 69 times, Scotland winning 66 times and five matches drawn. Since 1989, the teams have competed for the Centenary Quaich during the Six Nations Championship.

Summary

Overall

Records
Note: Date shown in brackets indicates when the record was or last set.

Results

Notes 
The match was abandoned after 20 minutes due to bad weather, with the scores level on goals and Scotland ahead on tries. The game was then replayed on 7 March 1885 in Scotland.

Images

See also
Centenary Quaich

References

  
Scotland national rugby union team matches
Ireland national rugby union team matches
Six Nations Championship
Rugby union rivalries in Scotland
Rugby union rivalries in Ireland